Queens Without a Crown (Spanish: Reinas sin corona) is a 2023 Peruvian drama film directed by Gino Tassara and written by Tassara and Lucía Covarrubias. Starring Daniela Romo, Francisca Aronsson and Alexandra Graña. It is inspired by real events and takes as a reference the story of the girl Jimenita, "the monster of Pachacamac", "the monster of the bicycle", "Clímaco: the crazy man with the hammer", the attack on Arlette Contreras, among other cases.

Synopsis 
Jimena lives tormented looking for help to report the attacks she has been receiving, however her mother Sonia lives in a parallel world. His grandmother Deifilia, who leads a network of child trafficking, will not be the best help. Everyone around Jimena is complicit in what is happening, but only a few will try to help her.

Cast 
The actors participating in this film are:

 Alexandra Graña as Sonia
 Francisca Aronsson as Jimena
 Daniela Romo as Deifilia
 Claudio Calmet
 Rossana Fernández Maldonado
 Katia Salazar
 Kukuli Morante
 Matías Raygada
 Omar García
 Julio Marcone
 Mariano Ramírez
 Elena Romero
 Edith Tapia

Production 
Principal photography of the film began on March 24, 2022, in the Municipality of La Punta and ended on May 10 of the same year. The movie was filmed in Mexico and Peru.

Release 
The film was scheduled to premiere on March 30, 2023, in Peruvian theaters, but it was brought forward to March 9, 2023, to coincide with International Women's Day.

References 

2023 films
2023 drama films
Peruvian drama films
2020s Spanish-language films
2020s Peruvian films
Films set in Peru
Films shot in Peru
Films shot in Mexico
Films about human trafficking
Films about violence against women
Films about mother–daughter relationships